Insular Italy ( or just , meaning "islands") is one of the five official statistical regions of Italy used by the National Institute of Statistics (ISTAT), a first level NUTS region and a European Parliament constituency. Insular Italy encompasses two of the country's 20 regions: Sardinia and Sicily.

Geography
Insular Italy occupies one sixth of the national territory in surface area. Territorially, both Sicily and Sardinia include several minor islands and archipelagoes administratively dependent on the mother islands.

Sicily is the largest island in the Mediterranean (25,708 km2) and one of the largest of Europe, while Sardinia is only slightly less extensive (24,090 km2). The lowlands are generally limited in the geographic region and generally appear as narrow coastal belts.  The only exceptions are the Campidano and Nurra in Sardinia and the Plain of Catania in Sicily that extend 1200 km2 and 430 km2 respectively.  The rest of the area is prevalently hilly, with hills occupying 70% of the territory. Sicily is home to Mount Etna, Italy's highest non-Alpine peak and Europe's largest active volcano.  Sardinia is home to the Gennargentu mountain range.

Demographics
The population of Insular Italy totals combined over 6.7 million residents.  Insular Italy has a population density of less than half the national average mainly because of the scarce population of Sardinia, one of the least densely populated regions of Italy and Europe. Sicily, on the other hand, has in fact a population density five times as high as Sardinia.

Overall, their combined populations total just one-tenth of the national population, making Insular Italy the least populated macro-region of the country.

Economy 
The Gross domestic product (GDP) of the region was 123.9 billion euros in 2018, accounting for 7% of Italy's economic output. GDP per capita adjusted for purchasing power was 18,500 euros or 62% of the EU27 average in the same year.

Socio-economic situation
The unemployment rate of Sicily is the highest in the country at 11.9%, while in Sardinia between 2006-07 it dropped for the first time below 10%, reaching 8.6%, the lowest of all the Mezzogiorno regions, excluding Molise and Abruzzo.

The low level of entrepreneurship in Sicily is tied to the local organized criminal activity, while in Sardinia it results from the rather expensive operating expenses (electricity, transportation, etc.), which are 20-50% higher than other regions due to its peripheral location from the Italian mainland and the lack of a proper territorial continuity (continuità territoriale). Such condition has been reduced in Sardinia with the development of information technologies, like Tiscali, low-cost carrier, like Ryanair, and some laws  regarding fares and routes between the islands and mainland Italy.

See also
 List of islands of Italy
National Institute of Statistics (Italy)
Italian Islands (European Parliament constituency)
Italian NUTS level 1 regions:
Northwest Italy
Northeast Italy
Central Italy
South Italy
NUTS:IT
Northern Italy
Southern Italy
Regions of Italy
Autonomous regions with special statute

References

Geography of Italy
NUTS 1 statistical regions of the European Union
Islands of Italy